It Snows in Benidorm is a 2020 Spanish drama film written and directed by Isabel Coixet. It stars Timothy Spall, Sarita Choudhury, Pedro Casablanc, Carmen Machi and Ana Torrent.

The film had its world premiere at the Valladolid International Film Festival on 24 October 2020. It was released in Spain on 13 November 2020, by Bteam.

Cast
 Timothy Spall as Peter Riordan
 Sarita Choudhury as Alex
 Pedro Casablanc as Esteban Campos
 Carmen Machi as Marta
 Ana Torrent as Lucía

Production
In February 2019, it was announced Isabel Coixet would write and direct the film, with Pedro Almodóvar and Agustín Almodóvar serving as producers via their El Deseo banner. In January 2020, Timothy Spall, Sarita Choudhury, Pedro Casablanc, Carmen Machi and Ana Torrent joined the cast of the film.

Principal photography began in January 2020.

Release
The film had its world premiere at the Valladolid International Film Festival on 24 October 2020. It was going to be released in Spain at November 13, 2020 by Betam , but It was delayed to December 11, 2020 due to the COVID-19 second wave in the country

References

External links
 

2020 films
2020 drama films
Spanish drama films
2020s Spanish-language films
English-language Spanish films
Films directed by Isabel Coixet
Films produced by Agustín Almodóvar
El Deseo films
2020s Spanish films